Rochfort Maguire (18 June 1815 – 29 June 1867) was an Irish Royal Navy officer who served as captain of  from 1852 to 1853 during the Franklin search expedition.

Career

Royal Navy 
Maguire joined the Royal Navy in 1830. He came to notice when he was wounded in action in 1840 at Sidon whilst serving on HMS Wasp under Sir Charles Napier.

Search for Franklin 
Maguire was assigned to the Franklin search expedition in 1848. They sailed out of Plymouth on a mission to find the lost remains of John Franklin's ill-fated Northwest Passage expedition of 1845. Maguire was made captain of HMS Plover from 1852 to 1854.

Later life 

He became commander-in-chief of Australian Station on 23 May 1866, before he was invalidated out on 28 May 1867. He died a month later, on 29 June, at Royal Hospital Haslar.

References

Further reading

External links 

 
 
 

1867 deaths
1815 births
Explorers of the Arctic
Irish Arctic explorers
Irish explorers of North America
People from County Westmeath
Royal Navy officers